Hendrik Devos (born 13 October 1955) is a former Belgian racing cyclist. He rode in eleven Grand Tours between 1979 and 1989.

References

External links

1955 births
Living people
Belgian male cyclists
People from Waregem
Cyclists from West Flanders